The 1638 Tipu rebellion was a widespread revolt of Mayan residents in the municipio or district of Bacalar in the second half of 1638. Led by Tipu, a pre-Columbian town and the most significant reducción or encomienda settlement in the district, it resulted in the removal of Bacalar and subsequent collapse of Spanish power in the region, leading to a 57-year revival of the Postclassic state of Dzuluinicob, of which Tipu had been capital.<ref

group=note>

Details of the rebellion and its aftermath remain unclear, as extant records are poor, and no records regarding Bacalar during  have survived (or been discovered) .

</ref>

Prelude

Prophecy 

K'atun 1 ahaw, the sixth k'atun of the short round of 15391796 (spanning thirteen k'atuno'ob), began on 6 June 1638. Mayan chilamo'ob (priests) prophesied the k'atun would usher in natural disaster and rebellion.<ref

group=note>

The short round's k'atuno'ob were–

.

</ref>

The prophecy included–
{{Text and translation| Hun ahaw katun / [...] / He ix bin tz'occebal u thanil e / Noh katun / Likom chan / Y etel ho tzuc chakan / Ti bateel / U chan katun / Hun ahau / Katun / Kakal / Moçon chac u cuch katun| Katun 1 Ahau / [...] / And that will be the ending of words: / The great war. / Risen will be the Chan / And the Tihosuco plain, / Who will fight / The Chan War / Of the 1 Ahau / Katun. / Fires / And hurricane rains are the burden of the katun.|by chilam Balam of Chumayel, compiled by J. J. Hoíl, translated by M. S. Edmonson.<ref

group=note>
This passage may be alternatively translated as–

</ref><ref

group=note>
It has been suggested that–
 the prophesied Chan War was to be centred near Tihosuco ,
 Chakan is meant as plain ,
 Chakan is meant as a reference to the eponymous ch'ibal or noble house in the Peten Itza kingdom ,
 Chan is meant as a reference to the eponymous ch'ibal or noble house in the Peten Itza kingdom .
</ref>
}}

'Idolatry' 

During a 1619 misión to Peten Itza, Franciscan friars Juan de Orbita and Bartolomé de Fuensalida found Tipuans had reverted to pre-Columbian polytheism, which they swiftly punished, destroying the residents' religious artefacts.

Hostilities 

The district's encomiendas were reconsolidated in 1622, leading to significantly heavier taxation of its Mayan residents.

Hispano-Mayan hostilities in the 17th century began in 1623, with massacres of Spanish soldiers, friars, and their Mayan servants and guides, at Nojpeten and Sacalum.This has been characterised as a sharp departure from Mayan practice, as '[n]ot since 1546 had execution as a tool of [Mayan] rebellion on such a large scale been seen in Yucatan.'

In 1637, Tipu sent an embassy to the defensor de naturales in Mérida to report their 'mistreatment' by their resident secular priest (Gregorio Marín de Aguilar) and the vecinos of Bacalar. The defensor informed the governor, who relieved Tipu's resident priest, and reprimanded the cabildo of Bacalar.<ref
group=note>

Marín de Aguilar had served as the district's secular priest since 1632 .

</ref>

Sometime during , Diego Zapata de Cárdenas, governor of colonial Yucatan, on the request of the defensor de naturales, sent two investigadores to Bacalar to investigate allegations of extortion (brought against the villa's vecinos of by the district's Mayan residents) and to punish offenders. The investigadores were unable to proceed, however, as the vecinos seized and attempted to hang them in impromptu gallows set up in the villa's plaza. The investigadores fled before they could be hanged, bringing to an end any possible investigación of the villa by the provincial governor.

In 1637, nearly all residents of Tipu, the largest reducción settlement in the district, (illicitly) deserted their town, (purportedly) fearing an oncoming aggressive campaign from Bacalar.<ref

group=note>

In 1637, the governor was informed by Bacalar that residents of Tipu had rebelled, disclaiming their obedience to the Spanish crown. As there was a Tipuan embassy in Merida at the time, the governor send them to Tipu with advice to the batab and principal inhabitants regarding the grave consequences of such rebellion. Tipu responded [in 1637 or 1638] 'with great submission,' informing the governor that residents had fled for fear of agression from Bacalar, but that the batab, his lieutenant, and an alcalde, had remained in town, and that they would endeavour to entice the deserters back to town .

</ref>

Piracy 

It has been suggested that Anglo-Dutch raids in the district of Bacalar likely encouraged the (illicit) desertion of coastal reducción settlements in favour of safer sites inland.<ref

group=note>

</ref>

Pirates are first thought to have entered the district in 1617, when an English crew raided Bacalar, abducting or impressing four vecinos. In the 1630s, residents of colonial Honduras began (illicitly) trading with Dutch and English ships in earnest, and pirates began impressing or enslaving Amerindian residents of the Yucatan peninsula and the Bay of Honduras. In 1637 and 1638, various Anglo-Dutch pirates were sighted cruising the Bay of Honduras, possibly reaching the district's waters.

Incident

1638 
In the third quarter of 1638, Mayan authorities at Tipu encouraged (or threatened) residents of various reducción or encomienda hamlets in the district of Bacalar to (illicitly) desert their settlements to join a (possibly armed) resistance to Bacalar-based from Tipu.<ref

group=note>
On 10 July 1638, Diego Zapata de Cárdenas, Marquis of Santo Floro and Governor of colonial Yucatan, informed Philip IV of Spain 'that ever since he had been in office [17 May 1636] he had received petitions from the defensor de naturales on behalf of the Indians of the [district of the] villa of Bacalar complaining about its Spaniards, mulattos, and mestizos [who often] extorted the Indians.' .

On 20 September 1638, Luís Sánchez de Aguilar, member of the cabildo of Salamanca de Bacalar, reported intelligence of these events to Diego Zapata de Cárdenas, Governor of colonial Yucatan, saying,

</ref> Tipu's advise (or threats) proved effective, as a quarter of the Mayan residents in hamlets near Tipu had (illicitly) fled by 20 September 1638. By 5 November 1638, a little under 200 of the district's circa 300 tributaries were allied with Tipu (having likewise fled there).

In the third week of September 1638, Luis Sánchez de Aguilar, alcalde, with the procurador, and 16 vecinos, discovered that Chinam, Manan, and Zacatan, coastal reducción settlements, had been deserted. They captured four runaways from Chinam, and all runaways from Manan. These were detained (and whipped, despite promises to the contrary) at Bacalar. All were (forcibly) resettled in Tamalcab, a reducción settlement (nearer to Bacalar than Manan).

By the fourth week of September 1638, the cabildo and vecinos of Bacalar, with the help of Mayan residents of San Juan de Extramuros, were attempting to resettle Pacha, Yumpeten, Soite, Manan, and Xibun, all of which had likewise been deserted.

In the fourth quarter of 1638, the governor supplied Bacalar with powder and ammunition, but not with troops, despite the cabildo'''s request for these. In addition, he requested Franciscan officials send three or four friars to the district to (peaceably) quell the rebellion. However, the Franciscan misión did not set out until 1642, and met with no success.<ref

group=note>

It has been suggested that the governor did not wish to provide a military solution to what the Spanish Crown deemed a problem properly solved by (peaceful) religious persuasion .

</ref>

On 5 November 1638, Luis Sánchez de Aguilar reported that their efforts had not met with much success, adding that 'right now the Indians are very bellicose.'

 Aftermath 

 1639 

Prior to 15 February 1639, Francisco de Cárdenas Valencia, a secular friar, bishop's vicar, and benefice in Sotuta, reported–

That same year, the governor and the ecclesiastical cabildo of Mérida sent Ambrosio de Figueroa, a secular friar, to the district of Bacalar, to entice Mayan residents to drop their resistance and resettle in their allotted reducción towns. Figueroa sent word to Tipu and its allies regarding his upcoming visit (and peaceful intentions), 'but the rebels made fun of [Figueroa's messengers] and threatened to kill them if they came back,' precluding the friar from reaching the district. However, Tipu indicated that they would meet with Franciscan friars, on the condition that the secular priest of Bacalar be replaced with a Franciscan one.

 1641 
On 24 April 1641, the governor and bishop sent Bartolomé de Fuensalida, Juan de Estrada, Bartolomé de Becerril, and Martín Tejero (all Franciscans), with 500 pesos for a six-month (peaceful) reducción, and instructions to relieve Bacalar's secular priest of his post. At Bacalar, it was determined that Fuensalida and Estrada continue on to Tipu, that Becerril focus on coastal settlements, and that Tejero remain in the villa.

Fuensalida and Estrada, with 21 Mayan servants and guides, never made it to Tipu, despite their earnest endeavours. In May or June 1641, the friars reached the former site of Zaczuz (a reducción settlement near Tipu, which had been deserted), where they (unsuccessfully) negotiated for their reception at Tipu. On 2 July 1641, they were led to Hubelna (an unauthorised hamlet of former Zaczuz residents). On 3 July 1641, the friars were met by a Tipuan–Itzaen war party, who made it clear that the friars were not welcome in Tipu, whereupon the friars were (forcibly) escorted back towards Bacalar. Fuensalida promptly reported their failure, advising the governor that a militarised reducción was the only viable option to quell the revolt. The governor recalled the friars, however, citing his lack of authority from the Spanish Crown for a military campaign.<ref

group=note>

Both Bartolomé de Fuensalida and Juan de Estrada fell ill during their misión to Tipu. Estrada never recovered, and died in Merida in 1646 (cf previous citation).

</ref>

Bartolomé de Becerril had better luck in the coastal reducción settlements of the district, as he and Martín Tejero resettled four settlements on the Sittee River, the Monkey River, and a caye called Zula. Their luck proved fleeting, however, as piratical raids of the resettled hamlets in 1641 and 1642 convinced residents to, again, (illicitly) relocate further inland.<ref

group=note>

In 1641, Becerril baptised, catechised, and settled (some) runaways from Campin in Soite and Cehake (reducción settlements on the Sittee River). Tejero settled runaways from Manan in Zula (a caye which the runaways chose, given that Manan had prior been flooded by a storm). Soite and Cehake were raided by Dutch pirates during Tejero's misión (who further detained the friar and a vecino accompanying him).

In 1642, Tejero baptised, catechised, married, and settled 73 runaways from Campin in Campin itself (a reducción settlement, possibly on the Monkey River). Campin was likewise sacked by pirates shortly after Tejero's departure.

</ref>

 1643 

On 5 March 1643, the bishop reported that eight reducción settlements (totalling some 300 Mayan families) had resettled in Tipu, leaving only six reducción'' settlements (totalling under 150 families) loyal to the Spanish Crown.<ref

group=note>

</ref>

Legacy

Social 

Shortly after 29 May 1652, Bacalar and the Mayan families still loyal to the villa were removed to Pacha, and in the 1660s still further inland to Chunhuhub. The villa's original site (on Lake Bacalar) was not resettled until the second quarter of 1727. Tipu and its allies did not assent to Spanish authority until the second or third quarter of 1695.

Scholarly 

Diego López de Cogolludo first brought the rebellion to light in 1688.

It was noted in the 1639 manuscript by Francisco de Cárdenas Valencia, first published in 1937, and rigorously explored by Grant D. Jones's archival work, published in 1989.

Notes

Citations

References 

 
 
 
 
 
 
 
 
 
 
 
 
 
 
 
 
 
 
 
 
 
 
 
 
 
 

17th century in Belize
1638 in North America